Rufino is a given name. Notable people with the name include:

Rufino Jiao Santos, Filipino Cardinal of the Roman Catholic Church
Rufino Jose Cuervo, Colombian writer
Rufino Segovia del Burgo, Spanish football player
Rufino Tamayo, Mexican painter
Fladimir Rufino Piazzi Júnior, (born 1978), Brazilian footballer
Rufino R. Ansara, Carleton University Professor

Spanish masculine given names